The Mysuru main line is the train line connecting the port city Chennai in Tamil Nadu to the palace city Mysore in Karnataka via Vellore, Bangalore.  This line is fully electrified.  Trains can achieve the maximum permissible speed of about 130 km/hr in this route. Some daily running trains are Kaveri Express and Mysore Shatabdi.  Some important junction falls in this line are Arakkonam Junction, Katpadi Junction  and Bangalore City railway station.

5 ft 6 in gauge railways in India
Rail transport in Tamil Nadu
Rail transport in Karnataka

Transport in Mysore
Transport in Chennai